Larry James Landon (born May 4, 1958) is a Canadian retired professional ice hockey forward who played 9 games in the National Hockey League for the Montreal Canadiens and Toronto Maple Leafs between 1984 and 1985. Most of his career, which lasted from 1981 to 1985, was spent in the American Hockey League.

Landon was born in Niagara Falls, Ontario.

Career statistics

Regular season and playoffs

External links

1958 births
Living people
Canadian ice hockey forwards
Ice hockey people from Ontario
Montreal Canadiens draft picks
Montreal Canadiens players
Nova Scotia Voyageurs players
RPI Engineers men's ice hockey players
St. Catharines Black Hawks players
St. Catharines Saints players
Sherbrooke Canadiens players
Sportspeople from Niagara Falls, Ontario
Toronto Maple Leafs players